John Conolly (1794–1866) was an English physician who was a pioneer in the field of psychiatry.

John Conolly may also refer to:

John Augustus Conolly (1829–1888), Irish soldier, recipient of the Victoria Cross
John Richard Arthur Conolly (1870–1945), Australian member of parliament, son of the above
John H. Conolly (1935–1988), American businessman and politician
John Conolly, British folk musician

See also
John Connolly (disambiguation)
John Connelly (disambiguation)
John Connally (1917–1993), American politician in Texas